Ruth Dorothy Louisa ("Wid") Gipps  (20 February 1921 – 23 February 1999) was an English composer, oboist, pianist, conductor, and educator. She composed music in a wide range of genres, including five symphonies, seven concertos, and numerous chamber and choral works. She founded both the London Repertoire Orchestra and the Chanticleer Orchestra and served as conductor and music director for the City of Birmingham Choir. Later in her life she served as chairwoman of the Composers' Guild of Great Britain.

Life and career 
Gipps was born at 14 Parkhurst Road, Bexhill-on-Sea, England in 1921 to (Gerard Cardew) Bryan Gipps (1877–1956), a businessman, English teacher in Germany, and later an official at the Board of Trade who was a trained violinist from a military family, and Hélène Bettina ( Johner), a piano teacher from Basel, Switzerland. They married in 1907, having met at the Hoch Conservatory in Frankfurt, where Hélène had trained and went on to teach, and where Bryan had gone against his family's wishes to study the violin.

Ruth Gipps had two elder siblings, Ernest (1910-2001), a violinist, and Laura (1908–1962), also a musician. The Gipps family had Kent roots, descending from the eighteenth-century apothecary, hop merchant, banker, and politician George Gipps; Sir George Gipps, Governor of New South Wales from 1838 to 1846, was a relative. At his marriage, Bryan Gipps had started a small business to allow his wife to focus on her music; after a few years, the business failed, and they moved to Germany, where he taught English. When they relocated to Bexhill-on-Sea at the outbreak of the First World War in 1914, the family was in the then unusual position of a middle-class household's mother being the main provider, which along with Hélène's idiosyncrasies attracted some attention. The family home was the Bexhill School of Music, of which Hélène was principal. Eventually becoming an official at the Board of Trade, her father was also the senior heir, via his mother, Louisa Goulburn Thomas, to the Carmarthenshire and Kent property of Richard Thomas, of Hollingbourne, near Maidstone, Kent, and of Cystanog, High Sheriff of Carmarthenshire in 1788.

Ruth was a child prodigy, winning performance competitions in which she was considerably younger than the rest of the field. After she performed her first composition at the age of 8 in one of the many music festivals she entered, the work was bought by a publishing house for a guinea and a half. Winning a concerto competition with the Hastings Municipal Orchestra began her performance career in earnest.

In 1937, she entered the Royal College of Music, where she studied oboe with Léon Goossens, piano with Arthur Alexander and composition with Gordon Jacob, and later with Ralph Vaughan Williams. Several of her works were first performed there. Continuing her studies at Durham University led her to meet her future husband, clarinettist Robert Baker. At age 26, for her work The Cat she became the youngest British woman to receive a doctorate in music.

She was an accomplished all-round musician, as a soloist on both oboe and piano as well as a prolific composer. Her repertoire included works such as Arthur Bliss's Piano Concerto and Constant Lambert's The Rio Grande. When she was 33 a shoulder injury ended her performance career, and she decided to focus her energies on conducting and composition.

An early success came when Sir Henry Wood conducted her tone poem Knight in Armour at the Last Night of the Proms in 1942. Gipps's music is marked by a skillful use of instrumental colour and often shows the influence of Vaughan Williams, rejecting the trends in avant-garde modern music such as serialism and twelve-tone music. She considered her orchestral works, her five symphonies in particular, as her greatest works. She also produced two substantial piano concertos. After the war Gipps turned her attention to chamber music, and in 1956 she won the Cobbett Prize of the Society of Women Musicians for her Clarinet Sonata, Op. 45. In March 1945, she performed Glazunov's Piano Concerto No. 1 with the City of Birmingham Orchestra as a piano soloist while also, in the same program, performing in her own Symphony No. 1 on cor anglais under the baton of George Weldon.

Her early career was affected strongly by discrimination against women in the male-dominated ranks of music (and particularly composition), by professors and judges as well as the world of music criticism. Because of it she developed a tough personality that many found off-putting, and a fierce determination to prove herself through her work.

She founded the London Repertoire Orchestra in 1955 as an opportunity for young professional musicians to become exposed to a wide range of music. In 1957, she conducted the Pro Arte Orchestra. She later founded the Chanticleer Orchestra in 1961, a professional ensemble which included a work by a living composer in each of its programs, often a premiere performance. Among these was the first London performance in September 1972 of the Cello Concerto by Sir Arthur Bliss in which the cellist Julian Lloyd Webber made his professional debut at the Queen Elizabeth Hall. Later she would take faculty posts at Trinity College London (1959 to 1966), the Royal College of Music (1967 to 1977), and then Kingston Polytechnic at Gypsy Hill. In 1967 she was appointed chairwoman of the Composers' Guild of Great Britain.

In London, her address was 20 Heathcote Road, St. Margaret's, Twickenham. On her retirement, Gipps returned to Sussex, living at Tickerage Castle near Framfield until her death in 1999, aged 78, after suffering the effects of cancer and a stroke. Her son, Lance Baker, was a professional horn player and orchestrator and brass teacher.

Music 
Stylistically, Gipps was a Romantic both in the musical sense and in her choice of extra-musical inspiration (for example the tone poem Knight in Armour). Although her music is not typically pastoral from a programmatic perspective, Gipps was heavily indebted to the English pastoralist school of the early 20th century, particularly her erstwhile teacher Vaughan Williams, but other figures, including Arthur Bliss (to whom she dedicated the Fourth Symphony), her contemporary Malcolm Arnold, and George Weldon were also influential. Her conservative, tonal style placed her at odds with contemporary trends in music such as serialism, of which she was highly critical.

Selected works

Orchestra 
 Variations on Byrd's "Non nobis", for small orchestra, Op. 7 (1942)
 Knight in Armour, tone poem, Op. 8 (1942)
 Sea Nymph, ballet for small orchestra (or for two pianos), Op. 14 (1941 ?)
 Symphony No. 1 in F minor, Op. 22 (1942)
 Death on a Pale Horse, tone poem, Op. 25 (1943)
 Chanticleer Overture, Op. 28 (1944)
 The Chinese Cabinet Suite for orchestra, Op. 29 (1945)
 Symphony No. 2 (in One Movement), Op. 30 (1945)
 Mahomet and the Cat, Op. 32 (1947)
 Song for Orchestra, Op. 33 (1948)
 Cringlemire Garden, Impression for String Orchestra, Op. 39 (1952)
 Coronation Procession for orchestra, Op. 41 (1953)
 Kensington Garden Suite, Op. 2, orchestral version (1953 ; orig. for oboe and piano, 1938)
 Pageant Overture The Rainbow, Op. 44 (1954)
 Symphony No. 3, Op. 57 (1965)
 Symphony No. 4, Op. 61 (1972)
 Symphony No. 5, Op. 64 (1982)
 Ambarvalia for small orchestra, Op. 70 (1988)

Concertante 
 Concerto for Clarinet and Orchestra, Op. 9 (1940).
 Jane Grey, Fantasy for Viola and String Orchestra (or piano), Op. 15 (1940)
 Concerto for Oboe and Orchestra in D minor, Op. 20 (1941, premiered by the Modern Symphony Orchestra under Arthur Dennington in the 1941/42 season)
 Concerto for Violin and Orchestra in B-flat major, Op. 24 (1943, premiered on 05.02.1944 with the Modern Symphony Orchestra conducted by Arthur Dennington and the composer's brother Bryan as soloist)
 Concerto for Piano and Orchestra in G minor, Op. 34 (1948)
 Concerto for Violin, Viola and Small Orchestra, Op. 49 (1957)
 Concerto for Horn and Orchestra, Op. 58 (1968)
 Leviathan for Contra-Bassoon and Chamber Orchestra, Op. 59 (1969)
 Introduction and Carol: The Ox and the Ass for Double Bass and Chamber Orchestra, Op. 71 (1996)
 Threnody for English Horn and Piano, Op. 74, version for English Horn, Strings and Harp (1990)

Chamber music 
 Kensington Garden Suite for Oboe and Piano, Op. 2 (1938)
 Sea-Shore Suite for Oboe and Piano, Op. 3b (1939)
 Chamois for 2 Violins and Piano, Op. 3c (1939)
 Honey-Coloured Cow for bassoon and piano, Op. 3d (1938)
 Sonata No.1 for Oboe and Piano in G minor, Op. 5 (1939)
 The Kelpie Of Corrievreckan for Clarinet and Piano, Op. 5b (1939)
 Pixie Caravan for Flute and Piano (1939)
 Rowan for Flute and Piano (1940)
 Trio for Oboe, Clarinet and Piano, Op. 10 (1940)
 The Piper of Dreams for Oboe Solo, Op. 12b (1940)
 Sea-Weed Song for English Horn and Piano, Op. 12c (1940)
 Suite for 2 Violins, Op. 12d (1940)
 Elephant God for Clarinet and Percussion, Op. 12e (1940)
 Sabrina, String Quartet in one movement, Op. 13 (1940)
 Quintet for Oboe, Clarinet, Violin, Viola and Cello, Op. 16 (1941)
 Brocade, Piano Quartet, Op. 17 (1941)
 Rhapsody in E for Clarinet Quintet, Op. 23 (1942)
 Rhapsody for Violin and Piano, Op. 27a (1943)
 Scherzo: The Three Billy Goats Gruff for Oboe, Horn, and Bassoon, Op. 27b
 Sonata for Violin and Piano, Op. 42 (1954)
 Sonata for Clarinet and Piano, Op. 45 (1955)
 Lyric Fantasy for Viola and Piano, Op. 46 (1955)
 String Quartet, Op. 47 (1956)
 Evocation for Violin and Piano, Op. 48 (1956)
 Prelude for Bass Clarinet Solo (or B Clarinet), Op. 51 (1958)
 Seascape for 2 Flutes, Oboe, English Horn, 2 Clarinets, 2 Bassoons and 2 Horns, Op. 53 (1958)
  A Tarradiddle for 2 Horns, Op. 54 (1959)
 Sonatina for Horn and Piano, Op. 56 (1960)
 Triton for Horn and Piano, Op. 60 (1970)
 Sonata for Cello and Piano, Op. 63 (1978)
 Octet for 2 Oboes, 2 Clarinets, 2 Bassoons and 2 Horns, Op. 65 (1983)
 Sonata No. 2 for Oboe and Piano, Op. 66 (1985)
 The Saint Francis Window for Alto Flute and Piano, Op. 67 (1986)
 The Riders of Rohan for Trombone and Piano (1987)
 Scherzo and Adagio for Cello Solo, Op. 68 (1987)
 Sinfonietta for 10 Winds and Percussion, Op. 73 (1989)
 Threnody for English Horn and Piano (or Organ), Op. 74 (1990)
 The Pony Cart for Flute, Horn and Piano, Op. 75 (1990)
 A Wealden Suite, Quartet for E, B, A and Bass Clarinets, Op. 76 (1991)
 Cool Running Water for Bass Flute and Piano, Op. 77 (1991)
 Pan and Apollo for 2 Oboes, English Horn and Harp, Op. 78 (1992)
 Sonata for Alto Trombone (or Horn) and Piano, Op. 80 (1995)
 Sonata for Double-Bass and Piano, Op. 81 (1986)

Piano 
 The Fairy Shoemaker (1929)
 Sea Nymph, ballet for small orchestra (or for two pianos), Op. 14 (1941 ?)
 Conversation for 2 Pianos, Op. 36 (1950)
 Theme and Variations, Op. 57a (1965) (transcription of Symphony No. 3, third movement)
 Opalescence, Op. 72 (1989)

Choral 
 Mazeppa's Ride for Female Chorus and Orchestra, Op. 1
 The Cat, Cantata for Alto, Baritone, Double Mixed Chorus and Orchestra, Op. 32 (1947)
 Goblin Market for 2 Sopranos, Female Chorus and String Orchestra (or Piano), Op. 40 (1953)
 An Easter Carol for Soprano, Mixed Chorus and Piano or Organ, Op. 52 (1958)
 Magnificat and Nunc dimittis for Mixed Chorus and Organ, Op. 55 (1959)
 Gloria in excelsis for Unison Chorus and Organ, Op. 62 (1977)
 A Service for Holy Communion for Mixed Chorus and Organ, Op. 62a (1974)

Vocal 
 Four Baritone Songs for Baritone and Piano, Op. 4b (1939)
 Heaven for High Voice and Piano (1939)
 Four Songs of Youth for Tenor and Piano (1940)
 Two Songs for Soprano and Piano, Op. 11 (1940)
 Rhapsody for Wordless Soprano and Small Orchestra, Op. 18
 Ducks for Soprano, Flute, Cello and Piano, Op. 19 (1941)
 The Song of the Narcissus for Soprano and Piano, Op. 37 (1951)
 Three Incantations for Soprano and Harp, Op. 50 (1957)
 The Lady of the Lambs for Soprano and Wind Quintet, Op. 79 (1992)

Discography
Recordings of the music of Ruth Gipps include:
 Cello Sonata, Theme & Variations for piano, Opalescence, Double Bass Sonata. Joseph Spooner (cello), David Heyes (double bass), Duncan Honeybourne (piano). Prima Facie (2021)
 Clarinet Sonata, Quintet for Oboe, Clarinet and String Trio, Op. 16. Peter Cigleris (clarinet), Gareth Hulse (oboe), Duncan Honeybourne (piano), Tippett Quartet. SOMM (2021)
 Clarinet Concerto, Op. 9. Robert Plane, BBC Scottish Symphony Orchestra, cond. Martyn Brabbins, 2020
 Cringlemire Garden, Op. 39. Southwest German Chamber Orchestra, Douglas Bostock, CPO Records 2021 (with collection of other British string works)
 Horn Concerto, Op. 58. David Pyatt (horn), London Philharmonic Orchestra conducted by Nicholas Braithwaite, Lyrita, 2007
 Octet for Wind, Op. 65 (2nd movement), Pan and Apollo, Op. 78. Members of BBC National Orchestra of Wales, broadcast 12/3/2021
 Piano Concerto, Op. 34, Theme and Variations for piano, Op. 57a, Opalescence, Op. 72. Angela Brownridge (piano), Malta Philharmonic Orchestra conducted by Michael Laus, Cameo Classics, 2014
 Piano Concerto, Op. 34, Ambarvalia, Op. 70. Royal Liverpool Philharmonic Orchestra conducted by Charles Peebles, soloist Murray McLachlan (2019).
 Seascape, Op. 53, Sinfonietta, Op. 73. Erie County Chamber Winds conducted by Rick Fleming. Mark Records, 2013
 Symphony No 2, Op. 30. Munich Symphony Orchestra, conducted by Douglas Bostock, ClassicO, 1999
 Symphony No 2, Op. 30, Symphony No 4. Op. 61, Knight in Armour, Op. 8, Song for Orchestra, Op. 33. BBC National Orchestra of Wales, conducted by Rumon Gamba, Chandos, 2018
 Symphony No 3, Oboe Concerto, Chanticleer, Death on the Pale Horse. BBC National Orchestra of Wales, conducted by Rumon Gamba, Chandos, 2022
 Symphony No 3, Op. 57. BBC Scottish Symphony Orchestra conducted by Ruth Gipps, broadcast 29 October 1969
 Symphony No 3, Op. 57. BBC Philharmonic Orchestra, conducted by Rumon Gamba, broadcast 9 October 2020
 Symphony No 5, Op. 64. London Repertoire Orchestra, conducted by Ruth Gipps, recording of a performance given in 1983.
 Violin Sonata, Op. 42, Rhapsody for violin and piano, Op.27a (1943), Evocation, Op.48 (1956). Patrick Wastnage (violin), Elizabeth Dunn (piano).Guild GMCD7827 (2022)

References

Further reading 
 Campbell, M. "Ruth Gipps: a woman of substance", Signature, 1/3 (1996), 15–20, 32–34
 Halstead, Jill, Lewis Foreman, and J. N. F. Laurie-Beckett (2001). "Gipps, Ruth (Dorothy Louisa) [Wid(dy) Gipps]". The New Grove Dictionary of Music and Musicians, 2nd edition, edited by Stanley Sadie and John Tyrrell. London: Macmillan.
 
 Holden, Raymond (2004). "Gipps, Ruth Dorothy Louisa (1921–1999), conductor and composer". Oxford Dictionary of National Biography.

External links 
 Classical Music on the Web: Obituary of Ruth Gipps
 Seattle Philharmonic: U.S. premiere of the Symphony No 2
 Christina Rossetti in Music: Ruth Gipp's Goblin Market (1954)
 BBC Composer of the Week, 8-12 March 2021

1921 births
1999 deaths
20th-century classical composers
20th-century classical pianists
20th-century British conductors (music)
20th-century English musicians
20th-century English women musicians
20th-century women composers
British women classical composers
English classical composers
English conductors (music)
English classical oboists
English classical pianists
English women pianists
Academics of the Royal College of Music
Alumni of the Royal College of Music
Alumni of Durham University
Musicians from Sussex
People from Bexhill-on-Sea
Pupils of Ralph Vaughan Williams
Women conductors (music)
Women oboists
People from Framfield
20th-century women pianists